Jordan Halsman (born 13 June 1991) is a Scottish professional footballer, who played for Elgin City until 2017. He plays as a left-sided full-back, but can also operate on the left side of midfield.

Whilst at Motherwell he had loan spells with Annan Athletic, Dumbarton and Albion Rovers. After Motherwell, he was signed with Greenock Morton and Cowdenbeath, whilst he has also played for Icelandic sides Fram and Breiðablik UBK.

Career
Halsman came from the Motherwell youth development programme, and was instrumental as the Motherwell under-19 side finished second in the 2009–10 Scottish Premier under-19 League behind Celtic. Halsman, along with four other youth players, signed a two-year professional contract with the Fir Park club. He made his SPL debut as a substitute on 17 October 2009 against Celtic in a 0–0 draw at Celic Park. On 28 February 2010, Halsman appeared on Soccer AM taking part in the Skill Skool contest, but only just lost out to Euan Lindsay of Hamilton Accies.

On 21 July 2010, Halsman moved to Third Division side Annan Athletic on loan until 17 January 2011. Halsman was offered the chance to stay at the Galabank outfit for the rest of the season. However, the left-sided youngster rejected this, as he attempts to force his way into Motherwell manager Stuart McCall's first-team plans. On 28 January 2011, Halsman joined Dumbarton on loan, initially for a month, but that was then extended until the end of the season as part of Nicky Devlin's transfer to Motherwell. Halsman scored his first Dumbarton goal in a 5–2 home win over Peterhead. On 20 January 2012, Halsman was again sent out on loan, this time to Albion Rovers of the Second Division. His loan spell ended when he was recalled by Motherwell on 21 March 2012. Halsman was then released at the end of his contract on 11 May 2012, having struggled to break into the Motherwell first-team.

In June 2012, Halsman signed a one-year deal with First Division side Greenock Morton. At the end of the season, Halsman moved to Iceland to sign for Fram. On the 29 January 2014 Halsman signed a one-year contract with Icelandic side Breidablik UBK. On 3 December 2014, Halsman returned to Scotland to sign for Scottish Championship side Cowdenbeath. Halsman made his debut on 6 December 2014 in a 1–0 defeat to Rangers at Ibrox Stadium. At the end of the 2014–15 season, Halsman was released by Cowdenbeath.

Personal life
Halsman's younger brother, Bradley, is also a professional footballer. He was also with the Motherwell Under-19 squad up until he was released in Summer 2011, and currently plays for Nairn County.

Honours

Greenock Morton
Scottish Football League First Division: Runners-Up 2012–13

Fram Reykjavík
Icelandic Cup: Winners 2013

References

External links
 
 Jordan Halsman profile at Motherwell FC official website

1991 births
Living people
Scottish footballers
Association football defenders
Motherwell F.C. players
Annan Athletic F.C. players
Dumbarton F.C. players
Albion Rovers F.C. players
Scottish Premier League players
Scottish Football League players
Footballers from Glasgow
Greenock Morton F.C. players
Scottish expatriate footballers
Knattspyrnufélagið Fram players
Expatriate footballers in Iceland
Scottish expatriate sportspeople in Iceland
Úrvalsdeild karla (football) players
Scottish Professional Football League players